This is a list of episodes for Season 14 of Late Night with Conan O'Brien, which aired from September 5, 2006 to August 31, 2007.

Series overview

Season 14

Episodes (season 14)